Porter Township is a township in Dickey County, in the U.S. state of North Dakota.

History
Porter Township was named in honor of three pioneer settlers: brothers Benjamin, Charles, and Oscar Porter.

References

Townships in Dickey County, North Dakota
Townships in North Dakota